Thomas Jonathan Jackson Christian Jr. (19 November 1915 – 12 August 1944) was a colonel in the United States Army Air Forces and commanding officer of the 361st Fighter Group during World War II. He was the great-grandson of American Civil War General Stonewall Jackson.

Early life and education
Christian was born in San Francisco, California on 19 November 1915. His father was brigadier-general Thomas Jonathan Jackson Christian Sr.

Pilot training
Christian graduated from the United States Military Academy at West Point in 1939 and entered the  Field Artillery Branch. He later joined the United States Army Air Corps. In 1940, after pilot training, he became an instructor at Randolph Field, Texas.

World War II
Christian was transferred to the 19th Bombardment Group at Clark Field in the Philippines in March 1941. During the Battle of the Philippines he was reassigned to Bataan and then Australia.

He was assigned to the 67th Pursuit Squadron at Henderson Field (Guadalcanal) in the Solomon Islands and flew a P-39 Airacobra.

He returned to the United States and was given command of the newly formed 361st Fighter Group (as a major) in February 1943. The group moved to RAF Bottisham in November of 1943. He was promoted to colonel in March 1944.

He was shot down and killed on 12 August 1944 near Boisleux-au-Mont, France.

Awards and decorations
Christian was awarded the Silver Star,  the Distinguished Flying Cross with Oak Leaf Cluster, the Air Medal with three Oak Leaf Clusters, and the Purple Heart.

See also
 Nathan Bedford Forrest III, another great-grandson of a notable Confederate general who was a high-ranking USAAF pilot killed in action in the ETO in World War II

References

External links

 

1915 births
1944 deaths
United States Army Air Forces personnel killed in World War II
Recipients of the Silver Star
United States Army Air Forces colonels
Aviators killed by being shot down
People from San Francisco
United States Army Air Forces pilots of World War II
United States Army officers
Recipients of the Distinguished Flying Cross (United States)
Recipients of the Air Medal
Aviators from California
Military personnel from California